is a song recorded by Japanese singer Shizuka Kudo. It was released as a single through Pony Canyon on June 2, 1993. It made its first album appearance on the compilation album, Super Best, released later that same year.

Background
"Watashi wa Knife" was written by Gorō Matsui and composed and produced by Tsugutoshi Gotō. It is a pop song reminiscent of Kudo's earlier material. Lyrically, the song describes a protagonist proclaiming herself to be a metaphorical knife "starved" for love and willing to measure up to a rough lover. During the promotional cycle for Super Best, Kudo revealed she doesn't like the title of the song. "I'm more of a saw", she said, half-joking. "Watashi wa Knife" received acclaim for Kudo's upfront vocals, as well as the song's "hard" hook culminating in an "epic" chorus, which were noted for producing an efficient change of pace and making the song memorable. Matsui and Gotō were praised for their practiced collaborative songwriting abilities.

Chart performance
The single debuted at number six on the Oricon Singles Chart, selling 75,000 copies in its first week. It charted in the top 100 for a total of nine straight weeks. With reported sales of 187,000 copies, "Watashi wa Knife" became Kudo's first single since her solo debut to not place in the top 100 of the year-end Oricon Singles Chart.

Track listing

Charts

Certification

References

1993 songs
1993 singles
Songs with lyrics by Gorō Matsui
Songs written by Tsugutoshi Gotō
Shizuka Kudo songs
Pony Canyon singles